Cryptanthus is a genus of flowering plants in the family Bromeliaceae, subfamily Bromelioideae. The genus name is from the Greek cryptos (hidden) and anthos (flower). The genus formerly had two recognized subgenera: the type subgenus and subgenus Hoplocryptanthus Mez which has been raised to the separate genus Hoplocryptanthus. All species of this genus are endemic to Brazil. The common name for any Cryptanthus is "Earth star".

Species
, Plants of the World Online accepted the following species:

Cryptanthus acaulis (Lindl.) Beer
Cryptanthus alagoanus Leme & J.A.Siqueira
Cryptanthus apiculatantherus D.M.C.Ferreira, E.M.Almeida & Louzada
Cryptanthus bahianus L.B.Sm.
Cryptanthus beuckeri É.Morren
Cryptanthus bibarrensis Leme
Cryptanthus bivittatus (Hook.) Regel
Cryptanthus boanovensis Leme
Cryptanthus brevibracteatus D.M.C.Ferreira & Louzada
Cryptanthus brevifolius Leme
Cryptanthus bromelioides Otto & A.Dietr.
Cryptanthus capitatus Leme
Cryptanthus capitellatus Leme & L.Kollmann
Cryptanthus cinereus D.M.C.Ferreira & Louzada
Cryptanthus colnagoi Rauh & Leme
Cryptanthus coriaceus Leme
Cryptanthus correia-araujoi Leme
Cryptanthus crassifolius Leme
Cryptanthus cruzalmensis Leme & E.H.Souza
Cryptanthus delicatus Leme
Cryptanthus diamantinensis Leme
Cryptanthus dianae Leme
Cryptanthus dorothyae Leme
Cryptanthus felixii J.A.Siqueira & Leme
Cryptanthus flesheri E.H.Souza & Leme
Cryptanthus giganteus Leme & A.P.Fontana
Cryptanthus grazielae H.Luther
Cryptanthus guanduensis Leme & L.Kollmann
Cryptanthus heimenii P.J.Braun & Gonç.Brito
Cryptanthus ilhanus Leme
Cryptanthus incrassatus L.B.Sm.
Cryptanthus lacerdae Van Geert
Cryptanthus lutandensis E.H.Souza & Leme
Cryptanthus lutherianus I.Ramírez
Cryptanthus lyman-smithii Leme
Cryptanthus marginatus L.B.Sm.
Cryptanthus maritimus L.B.Sm.
Cryptanthus minarum L.B.Sm.
Cryptanthus osiris W.Weber
Cryptanthus pickelii L.B.Sm.
Cryptanthus praetextus É.Morren ex Baker
Cryptanthus pseudopetiolatus Philcox
Cryptanthus reisii Leme
Cryptanthus reptans Leme & J.A.Siqueira
Cryptanthus rigidifolius Leme
Cryptanthus robsonianus Leme
Cryptanthus santateresinhensis Leme
Cryptanthus santosii Leme & E.H.Souza
Cryptanthus seidelianus W.Weber
Cryptanthus sergipensis I.Ramírez
Cryptanthus solidadeanus Leme & E.H.Souza
Cryptanthus tabuleiricola Leme & L.Kollmann
Cryptanthus teretifolius Leme
Cryptanthus ubairensis I.Ramírez
Cryptanthus univittatus Leme
Cryptanthus venecianus Leme & L.Kollmann
Cryptanthus viridipetalus Leme & L.Kollmann
Cryptanthus viridovinosus Leme
Cryptanthus walkerianus Leme & L.Kollmann
Cryptanthus warren-loosei Leme
Cryptanthus zonatus (Lem.) Vis.

Former species
A major revision of Cryptanthus in 2017 based on both morphological and molecular characters elevated a former subgenus to the genus Hoplocryptanthus and created two new genera, Forzzaea and Rokautskyia, transferring many former Cryptanthus species to these three genera.

Transferred to Forzzaea
Cryptanthus leopoldo-horstii Rauh → Forzzaea leopoldo-horstii (Rauh) Leme, S.Heller & Zizka
Cryptanthus micrus Louzada, Wand. & Versieux → Forzzaea micra (Louzada, Wand. & Versieux) Leme, S.Heller & Zizka
Cryptanthus warasii E.Pereira → Forzzaea warasii (E.Pereira) Leme, S.Heller & Zizka

Transferred to Haplocryptanthus
Cryptanthus caracensis Leme & E.Gross → Hoplocryptanthus caracensis 
Cryptanthus ferrarius Leme & C.C.Paula → Hoplocryptanthus ferrarius 
Cryptanthus glaziovii Mez → Hoplocryptanthus glaziovii 
Cryptanthus lavrasensis Leme → Hoplocryptanthus lavrasensis 
Cryptanthus regius Leme → Hoplocryptanthus regius 
Cryptanthus schwackeanus Mez → Hoplocryptanthus schwackeanus 
Cryptanthus tiradentesensis Leme → Hoplocryptanthus tiradentesensis

Transferred to Rokautskyia
Cryptanthus caulescens I.Ramírez → Rokautskyia caulescens
Cryptanthus exaltatus H.Luther → Rokautskyia exaltata
Cryptanthus fernseeoides Leme → Rokautskyia fernseeoides
Cryptanthus latifolius Leme → Rokautskyia latifolia
Cryptanthus leuzingerae Leme → Rokautskyia leuzingerae
Cryptanthus microglazioui I.Ramírez → Rokautskyia microglazioui (I.Ramírez) Leme, S.Heller & Zizka
Cryptanthus odoratissimus Leme → Rokautskyia odoratissima
Cryptanthus pseudoglaziovii Leme → Rokautskyia pseudoglaziovii
Cryptanthus pseudoscaposus L.B.Sm. → Rokautskyia pseudoscaposa
Cryptanthus roberto-kautskyi Leme → Rokautskyia roberto-kautskyi
Cryptanthus sanctaluciae Leme & L.Kollmann → Rokautskyia sanctaluciae
Cryptanthus scaposus E.Pereira → Rokautskyia scaposa
Cryptanthus whitmanii Leme → Rokautskyia whitmanii

References

External links
BSI Genera Gallery photos
 http://fcbs.org/pictures/Cryptanthus.htm

 
Endemic flora of Brazil
Bromeliaceae genera